TSS Copenhagen was a passenger vessel built for the Great Eastern Railway in 1907.

History

The ship was built by John Brown of Clydebank for the Great Eastern Railway as one of a contract for three new steamers and launched on 22 October 1907. She was launched by Miss Ida Hamilton, daughter of the Chairman of the Great Eastern Railway Company. 
 
She was placed on the Harwich to Hook of Holland route.

References

1907 ships
Steamships of the United Kingdom
Ships built on the River Clyde
Ships of the Great Eastern Railway
Maritime incidents in 1917
Ships sunk by German submarines in World War I
World War I shipwrecks in the North Sea